Diplolaena is a genus of  evergreen shrubs in the family Rutaceae. They are native to Western Australia.

Species include:

Diplolaena andrewsii  Ostenf.  
Diplolaena angustifolia  Hook.  — Yanchep rose
Diplolaena cinerea  Paul G.Wilson   
Diplolaena dampieri  Desf.  
Diplolaena drummondii  (Benth.) Ostenf.  
Diplolaena eneabbensis  Paul G.Wilson  
Diplolaena ferruginea  Paul G.Wilson   
Diplolaena geraldtonensis  Paul G.Wilson  
Diplolaena grandiflora  Desf.  — wild rose
Diplolaena graniticola  Paul G.Wilson   
Diplolaena leemaniana  Paul G.Wilson   
Diplolaena microcephala  Bartl.  — lesser diplolaena
Diplolaena mollis  Paul G.Wilson   
Diplolaena obovata  Paul G.Wilson  
Diplolaena velutina  (Paul G.Wilson) Paul G.Wilson

References

External links

Zanthoxyloideae
Zanthoxyloideae genera